Villiyavarambal is a village in the Kumbakonam taluk of Thanjavur district, Tamil Nadu.

Demographics 

As per the 2001 census, Agarathur had a total population of 1094 with 547 males and 547 females. The sex ratio was 1000. The literacy rate was 81.02.

References 

 

Villages in Thanjavur district